Richard Taylor (c. 1649 – 20 April 1699) was an English Member of Parliament.
He was the only son of Major Samuel Taylor of Wallingwells Priory, Nottinghamshire. He succeeded his father in 1679.

He was appointed High Sheriff of Nottinghamshire for 1689–90 and elected MP for East Retford in 1690, holding the seat until 1698.

He died in 1699 and was buried at Carlton. He had married Bridget, the daughter of Sir Ralph Knight of Langold and Warsop, Nottinghamshire, with whom he had a son, whom he outlived, and a daughter also named Bridget who married Thomas White and was the mother of John and Taylor White. On Taylor's death, the family seat at Wallingwells passed to his daughter Bridget and became the main seat of the White family.

References

 

1699 deaths
People from Bassetlaw District
English MPs 1690–1695
English MPs 1695–1698
High Sheriffs of Nottinghamshire
Whig (British political party) MPs
Year of birth uncertain